Terry McBride may refer to:
 Terry McBride (CEO), CEO of Nettwerk Music Group
 Terry McBride (musician), songwriter and singer